Çat is a town and district of Erzurum Province in the Eastern Anatolia region of Turkey. The mayor is Arif Hikmet Kılıç (CHP). The population is 4,463 (as of 2010).

Neighbourhoods

 Aşağıçatköy
 Babaderesi
 Bağlıca
 Bardakçı
 Başköy
 Bayındır
 Bozyazı
 Budaklar
 Çayırtepe
 Çimenözü
 Çirişli
 Çukurçayır
 Değirmenli
 Elmapınar
 Göbekören
 Gökçeşeyh
 Gölköy
 Hatunköy
 Işkınlı
 Kaplıca
 Karabey
 Karaca
 Karaşeyh
 Köseler
 Kumaşlı
 Kurbanlı
 Mollaömer
 Muratçayırı
 Parmaksız
 Saltaş
 Sarıkaşık
 Sarıkaya
 Soğukpınar
 Söbeçayır
 Şeyhhasan
 Taşağıl
 Tuzlataşı
 Tüysüz
 Yarmak
 Yaylasuyu
 Yukarıçat

References

Populated places in Erzurum Province
Districts of Erzurum Province
Kurdish settlements in Turkey